Elias Rezende de Oliveira (born 21 December 1999), known as Elias Carioca or simply Elias, is a Brazilian footballer who plays for Athletico Paranaense, as a forward.

Career statistics

Club

References

External links
Athletico Paranaense profile 

1999 births
Living people
Sportspeople from Rio de Janeiro (state)
Brazilian footballers
Association football forwards
Campeonato Brasileiro Série B players
Campeonato Brasileiro Série C players
Nova Iguaçu Futebol Clube players
Santa Cruz Futebol Clube players
Club Athletico Paranaense players
Guarani FC players